Acacia helicophylla is a shrub belonging to the genus Acacia and the subgenus Juliflorae that is native to northern Australia.

Description
It has red-brown to blackish coloured minni ritchi style bark peels in long slender strips. The densely haired branchlets are mostly terete with angular upper branchlets slightly and have wide irregular bands of resinous tissue. Like most species of Acacia it has phyllodes rather than true leaves. The light green phyllodes have a narrowly oblong to oblanceolate shape that is undulate or spirally twisted. They have six to eight longitudinal nerves with one prominent  midnerve. It blooms between March and August producing golden flowers. Following flowering thinly coriaceous seed pods form that have a narrowly oblong shape and can be constricted between the seeds. The seeds within are arranged longitudinally.

Taxonomy
The species was first formally described by the botanist Leslie Pedley in 1974 as part of the work Contributions from the Queensland Herbarium. It was reclassified as Racosperma helicophylla in 2003 by Pedley then transferred back to genus Acacia in 2006.

Distribution
It is endemic to the top end of the Northern Territory where it is found in a tropical climate in a small area in Nitmiluk National Park between Katherine Gorge and Gunlom Falls where it is usually situated on steep hillsides and on sandstone cliffs where it is found among rocks growing in skeletal sandy soils.

See also
List of Acacia species

References

helicophylla
Flora of the Northern Territory
Taxa named by Leslie Pedley
Plants described in 1974